Kapela Mbiyavanga (born 12 February 1976, in Kinshasa) is a Congolese retired footballer and current football manager.

International career
Mbiyavanga was part of the 2002 African Cup of Nations squad which lost to Senegal.

Notes

1976 births
Living people
Democratic Republic of the Congo footballers
Footballers from Kinshasa
Kabuscorp S.C.P. players
Democratic Republic of the Congo international footballers
C.D. Primeiro de Agosto players
Expatriate soccer players in South Africa
Daring Club Motema Pembe players
Democratic Republic of the Congo expatriate sportspeople in Angola
Maritzburg United F.C. players
Democratic Republic of the Congo expatriate sportspeople in South Africa
Expatriate footballers in Angola
Democratic Republic of the Congo expatriate footballers
Atlético Petróleos de Luanda players
2002 African Cup of Nations players
Association football forwards
21st-century Democratic Republic of the Congo people